Steven Russell Jordan (born January 10, 1961) is an American former professional football player who was a tight end in the National Football League (NFL) for the Minnesota Vikings from 1982 to 1994.

Early life and education

Steve Jordan grew up in Phoenix, Arizona and graduated from South Mountain High School. A multi-sport athlete, he played football, basketball, and tennis in high school, but he concentrated on academics.

He attended college at Brown University, where he graduated with a Bachelor of Science degree from the Brown University School of Engineering in 1982. In addition to his engineering coursework, he tried out for the football team and made the varsity lineup his sophomore year. Although the Brown coaching staff originally thought he would not play "a minute of varsity ball," Jordan was twice named to the first-team All-Ivy League squad and he also made All-America honorable mention. After his senior season, Jordan was awarded the Tuss McLaughry Trophy as the Brown football team member "who through sportsmanship, performance, and influence, contributed most to the sport at Brown." He was inducted into the Brown Bears athletic Hall of Fame in 1987.

NFL career

Jordan was the Vikings 7th round pick (179th overall) in the 1982 NFL draft. He played 13 seasons for the Vikings and was selected to six consecutive Pro Bowls from 1986 through 1991. He finished his NFL career with 498 receptions for 6,307 yards and 28 touchdowns. Viking head coach Jerry Burns praised Jordan's work ethic, noting that "no one on the Vikings works harder." During Jordan's years with the team, the Vikings won three NFC Central division titles, made the NFL playoffs six times, and reached the 1987 NFC Championship game, which they lost 17-10 to the Washington Redskins. The Redskins went on to win Super Bowl XXII.

Jordan's career statistics compare favorably to several NFL Hall of Fame inductees. For example, Jordan's 498 career receptions and 6,307 career yards exceeds Mike Ditka's 427 career receptions and 5,812 career yards, Dave Casper's 378 career receptions and 5,216 career yards, and John Mackey's 331 career receptions and 5,236 career yards.

Jordan still holds the Vikings all-time single-game receiving record for tight ends. During a game against the Washington Redskins on November 2, 1986, Jordan caught 6 passes for 179 yards and a touchdown. No Vikings tight end has ever caught for more yards in a single game.

Post-football career

After his retirement from the NFL, Jordan worked as a civil engineer for M.A. Mortenson of Minneapolis, Minnesota. He was elected to the Brown University Board of Trustees in 1993.

On October 25, 2019, the Minnesota Vikings inducted Jordan into the Vikings Ring of Honor. In announcing Jordan's selection, the Vikings co-owner and team president Mark Wilf noted that "Steve Jordan's impact on the Vikings has carried on past his career on the field. As great a player as Steve was, he's just as great an ambassador for the Vikings and the game of football. He is a positive role model to young players about the value of education and using your platform as an NFL star for good."

Upon his induction to the Ring of Honor, Jordan said, "I look back, and it's really good that something like this can happen, someone like me, who comes out of a small school can come to the Vikings and have a successful career, not just on the field but off the field."

Personal life

Jordan lives in Eagan, Minnesota. His son, Cameron Jordan, currently plays defensive end for the New Orleans Saints. He and his wife Anita had two more children, son Geoffrey and daughter Stephanie. Jordan is also the father-in-law of German football player Kasim Edebali.

References

1961 births
Living people
American football tight ends
Brown Bears football players
Minnesota Vikings players
National Conference Pro Bowl players
Players of American football from Phoenix, Arizona
Brown University School of Engineering alumni